Fóstbræður (English: Blood brothers) was a comedy sketch show which premiered on the Icelandic Stöð 2 in October 1997.

Writing
The show was written by the stars themselves, Sigurjón Kjartansson, Jón Gnarr, Helga Braga Jónsdóttir, Þorsteinn Guðmundsson (season 2–5), Benedikt Erlingsson (season 1–3), Gunnar Jónsson (Season 3–5) and Hilmir Snær Guðnason (season 1 only).

Awards and Perception
The show's five seasons (from 1997 to 2001) were received with much enthusiasm by the TV-watching public in Iceland, winning four Edda awards (1999, 2000 and 2001)

Later releases
Because of demand, the show was released on VHS in 2000, and on DVD in 2007.

References 

1997 Icelandic television series debuts
2001 Icelandic television series endings
1990s Icelandic television series
2000s Icelandic television series
Icelandic comedy television series
Icelandic-language television shows
Stöð 2 original programming